Helen Roberts (1912–2010) was an English soprano singer.

Helen Roberts may also refer to:

Helen Heffron Roberts (1888–1985), an American anthropologist and ethnomusicologist
Helen M. Roberts (1896–1983), an American writer, photographer, and multilingual educator